Proeung is a Khmer name. Notable people with the name include:

Pho Proeung (1903–1975), Prime Minister of Cambodia from 1960 to 1961
Dy Proeung (born 1930s), Cambodian architect

Khmer-language names